Waterloo Lily is the fourth album by Caravan, released in 1972 on the Deram label.

Background 
The album cover is detail from "The Tavern Scene" from A Rake's Progress by William Hogarth. The track "The Love in Your Eye" has been featured as a Caravan live track for many years.

Recording 
Waterloo Lily is the only album by Caravan with Steve Miller (brother of Phil Miller) as the keyboard player. Miller brought a jazz-focused sound to the album than had been heard on the previous album through his stylings on the Wurlitzer piano rather than the Hammond organ favored by previous keyboardist Dave Sinclair. Guests Phil Miller and Lol Coxhill from Steve Miller's previous band Delivery play on "Nothing at all", an instrumental modeled after Miles Davis's "Right Off". Soon after Waterloo Lily, Richard Sinclair and Steve Miller left Caravan to play with Phil Miller and Coxhill in a re-formed Delivery, which led to the formation the band Hatfield and the North.

Track listing
All compositions by Coughlan, Hastings, Sinclair except "It's Coming Soon" and "Songs and Signs" by Miller.

Side one

Side two

The following bonus tracks were included on the 2001 remastered edition of the CD.

Personnel 
Caravan
 Pye Hastings – guitars & vocals
 Steve Miller – Wurlitzer electric piano, grand piano, Hammond organ, electric harpsichord
 Richard Sinclair – bass & vocals
 Richard Coughlan – drums

Additional personnel
 Lol Coxhill – soprano saxophone (1, 2)
 Phil Miller – 2nd lead guitar (2)
 Jimmy Hastings – flute (5)
 Mike Cotton – trumpet (5)
 Barry Robinson – oboe (5)

References

External links
 
 
 Caravan - Waterloo Lily (1972) album review by Lindsay Planer, credits, releases and Billboard charts at AllMusic.com

1972 albums
Caravan (band) albums
Deram Records albums
Albums produced by Dave Hitchcock